The 1952 United States presidential election in Tennessee took place on November 4, 1952, as part of the 1952 United States presidential election. Tennessee voters chose 11 representatives, or electors, to the Electoral College, who voted for president and vice president.

Tennessee was won by former Supreme Allied Commander Dwight D. Eisenhower (R–Kansas), running with Senator Richard Nixon, with 49.99% of the popular vote, against Adlai Stevenson (D–Illinois), running with Senator John Sparkman, with 49.71% of the popular vote.

Eisenhower’s victory was the first of three consecutive Republican victories in the state, as Tennessee would not vote Democratic again until Lyndon B. Johnson’s landslide victory in 1964. This is also the only presidential election since 1924 in which Tennessee voted differently than neighboring Kentucky.

Results

Results by county

Notes

References

Tennessee
1952
1952 Tennessee elections